The Doctor Who 25th Anniversary Album is a 1988 compilation album of music from Doctor Who. Mainly consisting of selections of Keff McCulloch's incidental music, it also included versions of the Doctor Who theme by Delia Derbyshire, Peter Howell, Dominic Glynn and McCulloch. It was subsequently reissued in 1997 as Evolution - The Music From Dr Who on Prestige Records. However, this issue was mastered at the wrong speed, the whole album playing much too fast. It was also reissued as Music from Doctor Who by Castle Pulse in July 2002.

Track listing

See also
Doctor Who theme music
List of music featured on Doctor Who
:Category:Doctor Who music
Doctor Who Soundtrack

References

25th Anniversary Album
1988 compilation albums
Soundtrack compilation albums
BBC Records compilation albums
BBC Records soundtracks